is a former Japanese football player. He played for the Japan national team.

Club career
Watanabe was born in Nasu, Tochigi on June 4, 1953. After graduating from high school, he joined his local club Towa Real Estate in 1972. The club moved to Tokyo and was changed to "Fujita Industries". The club won the league champions in 1977, 1979 and 1981. The club also won 1977 and 1979 Emperor's Cup. He retired in 1983. He played 201 games and scored 34 goals in the league.

National team career
On February 12, 1974, Watanabe debuted for Japan national team against Singapore. In September, he was selected Japan for 1974 Asian Games. He also played at 1976 Summer Olympics qualification. He played 28 games and scored 4 goals for Japan until 1979.

Club statistics

National team statistics

References

External links
 
 Japan National Football Team Database

1953 births
Living people
Association football people from Tochigi Prefecture
Japanese footballers
Japan international footballers
Japan Soccer League players
Shonan Bellmare players
Footballers at the 1974 Asian Games
Association football midfielders
Asian Games competitors for Japan
Association football forwards